Silene nivalis is a flowering plant in the pink family (Caryophyllaceae) native to Romania. A smut fungus, Microbotryum violaceum affects the anthers.

References

nivalis